Akintunde Popoola is an Anglican bishop in Nigeria: he was Bishop of the Offa diocese until 2018 and is now the incumbent of Ibadan South.

Notes

Anglican bishops of Offa
Anglican bishops of Ibadan South
21st-century Anglican bishops in Nigeria
Year of birth missing (living people)
Living people